Borino is a rural locality (a village) in Bolshekochinskoye Rural Settlement, Kochyovsky District, Perm Krai, Russia. The population was 155 as of 2010. There are 3 streets.

Geography 
Borino is located 25 km northeast of Kochyovo (the district's administrative centre) by road. Zuyevo is the nearest rural locality.

References 

Rural localities in Kochyovsky District